Adinandra corneriana is a species of plant in the Pentaphylacaceae family. It is a tree endemic to Peninsular Malaysia. It is threatened by habitat loss.

References

corneriana
Endemic flora of Peninsular Malaysia
Trees of Peninsular Malaysia
Vulnerable flora of Asia
Taxonomy articles created by Polbot